Jorge Daniel Aquino Guerrero (born 14 December 1987) is a Paraguayan footballer. His current club is Santiago Morning.

External links
 
 

1987 births
Living people
Paraguayan footballers
Paraguayan expatriate footballers
Sportspeople from Ciudad del Este
Club Sol de América footballers
Curicó Unido footballers
Rangers de Talca footballers
Naval de Talcahuano footballers
Expatriate footballers in Chile
Deportes Concepción (Chile) footballers
Association football defenders